Ron Johnson (born 1955) is a United States Republican senator for Wisconsin.

Ronald or Ron Johnson may also refer to:

Politics
Ronald Johnson (Alabama politician) (1943–2020), Republican member of the Alabama House of Representatives
Ron Johnson (Florida politician) (born 1949), Democrat, served in the Florida House of Representatives
Ron Johnson (Canadian politician) (born 1966), Canadian politician in Ontario

Sports

Gridiron football
Ron Johnson (running back) (1947–2018), American football player (Cleveland Browns, New York Giants)
Ron Johnson (quarterback) (born c. 1947), Canadian football player
Ron Johnson (cornerback) (1956–2018), American football player for the Pittsburgh Steelers
Ron Johnson (wide receiver, born 1958), American football player
Ron Johnson (defensive end) (born 1979), American football player
Ron Johnson (wide receiver, born 1980), American football player
Ronald Johnson (wide receiver, born 1988) (born 1988), American football player

Other sports
Ron Johnson (speedway rider) (1907–1983), Australian motorcycle speedway rider
Ron Johnson (Australian footballer) (1938–2023), Australian footballer for Richmond
Ron Johnson (basketball) (1938–2015), American basketball player
Ron Johnson (baseball) (1956–2021), American professional baseball player, minor league manager and major league coach
Ronny Johnson (born 1962), American-Australian baseball player
Ronnie Johnson (born 1993), American basketball player

Others
Ronald Johnson (poet) (1935–1998), American poet
Sammy Johnson (Ronald Samuel Johnson, 1949–1998), English actor
Ron Johnson (businessman) (born 1959), American businessman and retail executive
Ronald S. Johnson, Missouri State Highway Patrol captain and a notable figure in the Ferguson unrest of 2014

Other uses
Ron Johnson Records, a record label

See also
Ronny Johnsen (born 1969), Norwegian footballer
Ron Johnstone (born 1949), Minister of the Free Presbyterian Church, Northern Ireland
Rob Johnson (disambiguation)
Jon Ronson (born 1967), British-American journalist, documentary filmmaker, radio presenter and author